The 1990–91 season was the 76th season of the Isthmian League, which is an English football competition featuring semi-professional and amateur clubs from London, East and South East England. 

League consisted of three divisions. The Second Division was divided into two sections. At the end of the season Division Two North and Division Two South were merged into single Division Two and Division Three was formed.

Premier Division

The Premier Division consisted of 22 clubs, including 19 clubs from the previous season and three new clubs:
 Enfield, relegated from the Football Conference
 Wivenhoe Town, promoted as champions of Division One
 Woking, promoted as runners-up in Division One

League table

Division One

Division One consisted of 22 clubs, including 16 clubs from the previous season and six new clubs:

Two clubs relegated from the Premier Division:
 Bromley
 Dulwich Hamlet

Two clubs promoted from Division Two North:
 Aveley
 Heybridge Swifts

Two clubs promoted from Division Two South:
 Molesey
 Yeading

League table

Division Two North

Division Two North consisted of 22 clubs, including 19 clubs from the previous season and three new clubs:

 Kingsbury Town, relegated from Division One
 Purfleet, relegated from Division One
 Edgware Town, joined from the Spartan League

At the end of the season Division Two North and Division Two South were merged into single Division Two and also Division Three was formed. Finchley merged with Wingate to form Wingate & Finchley who took Wingate's place in the South Midlands League Premier Division, while Basildon United resigned to the Essex Senior League.

League table

Division Two South

Division Two South consisted of 22 clubs, including 19 clubs from the previous season and three new clubs:

 Cove, joined from the Combined Counties League
 Hampton, relegated from Division One
 Leatherhead, relegated from Division One

At the end of the season Division Two North and Division Two South were merged into single Division Two and also Division Three was formed.

Before the next season started Feltham merged with the Hellenic League side Hounslow F.C. to create Feltham & Hounslow Borough F.C.

League table

See also
Isthmian League
1990–91 Northern Premier League
1990–91 Southern Football League

References

Isthmian League seasons
6